Hardcastle may refer to:

a family, the members of which are principal characters in Oliver Goldsmith's play She Stoops to Conquer
Bill Hardcastle (1874–1944), New Zealand rugby player
Diana Hardcastle, British actress
Douglas Hardcastle (1886–1915), English footballer
Edgar Hardcastle (1900–1995), theorist of Marxist economics
Edward Hardcastle (1826–1905), British businessman and Conservative politician
Frances Hardcastle (1866–1941), English mathematician
Frank Hardcastle (1844–1908), British industrialist and Conservative politician
Joseph Hardcastle (disambiguation), several people
Leslie Hardcastle (born 1926), controller of the British Film Institute
Michael Hardcastle (born 1933), British author of children's sports fiction
Paul Hardcastle (born 1957), composer
Rick Hardcastle (born 1956), Texas politician
Sally Hardcastle (1945–2014), British journalist and radio presenter
Sarah Hardcastle (born 1969), English swimmer
Sexton Hardcastle (born 1973), pro wrestler; ring-name for Adam Copeland.
Sonya Hardcastle (born 1972), New Zealand netballer
William Hardcastle (broadcaster) (1918–1975), British journalist and radio news presenter
Hardcastle and McCormick, a 1980s television series

English-language surnames
Surnames of English origin